Foreign aid to Iraq has increased to handle reconstruction efforts.

In 2004 the U.S. Agency for International Development was responsible for awarding contracts totaling US$900 million for capital construction, seaport renovation, personnel support, public education, public health, government administration, and airport management. The World Bank committed US$3 billion to US$5 billion for reconstruction over a five-year period, and smaller commitments came from Japan, the European Union, Britain, and Spain. Russia canceled 65 percent of Iraq's debt of US$8 billion, and Saudi Arabia offered an aid package totaling US$1 billion. Also, Iran has been accused of giving some monetary support to individual political parties. Some US$20 billion of U.S. 2004 appropriations for Iraq were earmarked for reconstruction. Effective application of such funds, however, depends on substantial improvement in infrastructural and institutional resources. Because Iraq's international debt situation had not been elaborated in 2005, for the foreseeable future U.S. funds are expected to pay for capital investments in rebuilding.

Funding programs
Development Fund for Iraq
Iraq Relief and Reconstruction Fund

See also
 United States foreign aid

External links
 USAID Assistance for Iraq
Iraq Inter-Agency Information & Analysis Unit Reports, Maps and Assessments of Iraq's Governorates from the UN Inter-Agency Information & Analysis Unit

Foreign relations of Iraq
Iraq